Scalmicauda is a genus of moths of the family Notodontidae. The genus was erected by William Jacob Holland in 1893.

Species
Scalmicauda acamas Kiriakoff, 1968
Scalmicauda actor Kiriakoff, 1968
Scalmicauda adusta Kiriakoff, 1963
Scalmicauda afra Kiriakoff, 1968
Scalmicauda agasthenes Kiriakoff, 1968
Scalmicauda albobrunnea Kiriakoff, 1968
Scalmicauda alboterminalis Kiriakoff, 1962
Scalmicauda albunea Kiriakoff, 1968
Scalmicauda aliena Kiriakoff, 1962
Scalmicauda amphion Kiriakoff, 1968
Scalmicauda ancaeus Kiriakoff, 1968
Scalmicauda andraemon Kiriakoff, 1968
Scalmicauda antiphus Kiriakoff, 1968
Scalmicauda argenteomaculata (Aurivillius, 1892)
Scalmicauda astyoche Kiriakoff, 1968
Scalmicauda auribasis Kiriakoff, 1975
Scalmicauda azebae Thiaucourt, 1977
Scalmicauda benga Holland, 1893
Scalmicauda bernardii Kiriakoff, 1968
Scalmicauda bicolorata Gaede, 1928
Scalmicauda brevipennis (Holland, 1893)
Scalmicauda chalcedona Kiriakoff, 1968
Scalmicauda confusa Kiriakoff, 1959
Scalmicauda corinna Kiriakoff, 1968
Scalmicauda corona Kiriakoff, 1968
Scalmicauda costalis Kiriakoff, 1965
Scalmicauda curvilinea Kiriakoff, 1959
Scalmicauda decorata Kiriakoff, 1962
Scalmicauda ectoleuca Hampson, 1910
Scalmicauda ectomelinos Kiriakoff, 1962
Scalmicauda epistrophus Kiriakoff, 1968
Scalmicauda eriphyle Kiriakoff, 1979
Scalmicauda eumela Kiriakoff, 1968
Scalmicauda evadne Kiriakoff, 1979
Scalmicauda fuscinota Aurivillius, 1904
Scalmicauda geometrica Kiriakoff, 1969
Scalmicauda griseomaculata Gaede, 1928
Scalmicauda hoesemanni (Strand, 1911)
Scalmicauda ignicolor Kiriakoff, 1964
Scalmicauda lineata (Holland, 1893)
Scalmicauda lycaon Kiriakoff, 1968
Scalmicauda macrosema Kiriakoff, 1959
Scalmicauda melasema Kiriakoff, 1959
Scalmicauda molesta (Strand, 1911)
Scalmicauda molestula Kiriakoff, 1959
Scalmicauda myrine Kiriakoff, 1968
Scalmicauda obliterata Kiriakoff, 1962
Scalmicauda obscurior Gaede, 1928
Scalmicauda oileus Kiriakoff, 1968
Scalmicauda oneili Janse, 1920
Scalmicauda oreas Kiriakoff, 1958
Scalmicauda orthogramma Kiriakoff, 1960
Scalmicauda ovalis Kiriakoff, 1965
Scalmicauda pandarus Kiriakoff, 1968
Scalmicauda paucinotata Kiriakoff, 1959
Scalmicauda phorcys Kiriakoff, 1968
Scalmicauda podarce Kiriakoff, 1968
Scalmicauda pylaemenes Kiriakoff, 1968
Scalmicauda rectilinea (Gaede, 1928)
Scalmicauda remmia Kiriakoff, 1959
Scalmicauda rubrolineata Kiriakoff, 1959
Scalmicauda subfusca Kiriakoff, 1959
Scalmicauda talaeon Kiriakoff, 1968
Scalmicauda terminalis Kiriakoff, 1959
Scalmicauda tessmanni (Strand, 1911)
Scalmicauda thessala Kiriakoff, 1968
Scalmicauda triangulum Kiriakoff, 1959
Scalmicauda tricolor Kiriakoff, 1965
Scalmicauda uniarcuata Kiriakoff, 1962
Scalmicauda uniarculinea Kiriakoff, 1965
Scalmicauda venustissima Kiriakoff, 1969
Scalmicauda vinacea Kiriakoff, 1959
Scalmicauda vulpinaria Kiriakoff, 1965
Scalmicauda xanthogyna Hampson, 1910

External links

Notodontidae